This is a list of algebraic geometry topics, by Wikipedia page.

Classical topics in projective geometry
Affine space
Projective space
Projective line, cross-ratio
Projective plane
Line at infinity
Complex projective plane
Complex projective space
Plane at infinity, hyperplane at infinity
Projective frame
Projective transformation
Fundamental theorem of projective geometry
Duality (projective geometry)
Real projective plane
Real projective space
Segre embedding of a product of projective spaces
Rational normal curve

Algebraic curves
Conics, Pascal's theorem, Brianchon's theorem
Twisted cubic
Elliptic curve, cubic curve
Elliptic function, Jacobi's elliptic functions, Weierstrass's elliptic functions
Elliptic integral
Complex multiplication
Weil pairing
Hyperelliptic curve
Klein quartic
Modular curve
Modular equation
Modular function
Modular group
Supersingular primes
Fermat curve
Bézout's theorem
Brill–Noether theory
Genus (mathematics)
Riemann surface
Riemann–Hurwitz formula
Riemann–Roch theorem
Abelian integral
Differential of the first kind
Jacobian variety
Generalized Jacobian
Moduli of algebraic curves
Hurwitz's theorem on automorphisms of a curve
Clifford's theorem on special divisors
Gonality of an algebraic curve
Weil reciprocity law
Goppa code

Algebraic surfaces
Enriques–Kodaira classification
List of algebraic surfaces
Ruled surface
Cubic surface
Veronese surface
Del Pezzo surface
Rational surface
Enriques surface
K3 surface
Hodge index theorem
Elliptic surface
Surface of general type
Zariski surface

Algebraic geometry: classical approach
Algebraic variety
Hypersurface
Quadric (algebraic geometry)
Dimension of an algebraic variety
Hilbert's Nullstellensatz
Complete variety
Elimination theory
Gröbner basis
Projective variety
Quasiprojective variety
Canonical bundle
Complete intersection
Serre duality
Spaltenstein variety
Arithmetic genus, geometric genus, irregularity
Tangent space, Zariski tangent space
Function field of an algebraic variety
Ample line bundle
Ample vector bundle
Linear system of divisors
Birational geometry
Blowing up
Resolution of singularities
Rational variety
Unirational variety
Ruled variety
Kodaira dimension
Canonical ring
Minimal model program
Intersection theory
Intersection number
Chow ring
Chern class
Serre's multiplicity conjectures
Albanese variety
Picard group
Modular form
Moduli space
Modular equation
J-invariant
Algebraic function
Algebraic form
Addition theorem
Invariant theory
Symbolic method of invariant theory
Geometric invariant theory
Toric variety
Deformation theory
Singular point, non-singular
Singularity theory
Newton polygon
Weil conjectures

Complex manifolds
Kähler manifold
Calabi–Yau manifold
Stein manifold
Hodge theory
Hodge cycle
Hodge conjecture
Algebraic geometry and analytic geometry
Mirror symmetry

Algebraic groups
Linear algebraic group
Additive group
Multiplicative group
Algebraic torus
Reductive group
Borel subgroup
Parabolic subgroup
Radical of an algebraic group
Unipotent radical
Lie-Kolchin theorem
Haboush's theorem (also known as the Mumford conjecture)
Group scheme
Abelian variety
Theta function
Grassmannian
Flag manifold
Weil restriction
Differential Galois theory

Contemporary foundations

Commutative algebra
Prime ideal
Valuation (algebra)
Krull dimension
Regular local ring
Regular sequence
Cohen–Macaulay ring
Gorenstein ring
Koszul complex
Spectrum of a ring
Zariski topology
Kähler differential
Generic flatness
Irrelevant ideal

Sheaf theory
Locally ringed space
Coherent sheaf
Invertible sheaf
Sheaf cohomology
Coherent sheaf cohomology
Hirzebruch–Riemann–Roch theorem
Grothendieck–Riemann–Roch theorem
Coherent duality
Dévissage

Schemes
Affine scheme
Scheme
Éléments de géométrie algébrique
Grothendieck's Séminaire de géométrie algébrique
Fiber product of schemes
Flat morphism
Smooth scheme
Finite morphism
Quasi-finite morphism
Proper morphism
Semistable elliptic curve
Grothendieck's relative point of view
Hilbert scheme

Category theory
Grothendieck topology
Topos
Derived category
Descent (category theory)
Grothendieck's Galois theory
Algebraic stack
Gerbe
Étale cohomology
Motive (algebraic geometry)
Motivic cohomology
A¹ homotopy theory
Homotopical algebra

Algebraic geometers
Niels Henrik Abel
Carl Gustav Jacob Jacobi
Jakob Steiner
Julius Plücker
Arthur Cayley
Bernhard Riemann
Max Noether
William Kingdon Clifford
David Hilbert
Italian school of algebraic geometry
Guido Castelnuovo
Federigo Enriques
Francesco Severi
Solomon Lefschetz
Oscar Zariski
W. V. D. Hodge
Sir Michael Atiyah
Kunihiko Kodaira
André Weil
Jean-Pierre Serre
Alexander Grothendieck
Friedrich Hirzebruch
Igor Shafarevich
Heisuke Hironaka
Shreeram S. Abhyankar
Pierre Samuel
C.P. Ramanujam
David Mumford
Michael Artin
Phillip Griffiths
Pierre Deligne
Yuri Manin
Shigefumi Mori
Vladimir Drinfeld
Vladimir Voevodsky
Claire Voisin
János Kollár
Caucher Birkar

 
Mathematics-related lists
Outlines of mathematics and logic
Wikipedia outlines